Al-Ghariyeh is a town in Suwayda Governorate, in southern Syria. The town is the administrative center of the Gharieh Nahiya. The town has a population of 3,808 as per the 2004 census. The towns entire population is composed of Druze people.

References

Populated places in Salkhad District